Carl-Erik Grimstad  (born 17 September 1952) is a Norwegian politician. 
He was elected representative to the Storting for the period 2017–2021 for the Liberal Party.

References

1952 births
Living people
Liberal Party (Norway) politicians
Members of the Storting
Vestfold politicians